The 1925 Mississippi A&M Aggies football team was an American football team that represented the Agricultural and Mechanical College of the State of Mississippi (later renamed Mississippi State University) as a member of the Southern Conference during the 1925 season. In its first season under head coach Bernie Bierman, the team compiled a 3–4–1 record (1–4 against conference opponents), tied for 16th place in the conference, and outscored all opponents by a total of 101 to 60. The team played its home games at Davis Wade Stadium in Starkville, Mississippi.

Four Mississippi A&M players were selected by the Daily Clarion-Ledger as first-team players on its 1925 All-Mississippi football team: Meeks at quarterback; Clark at right halfback; Stone at left end; and Jones at center.

Schedule

References

Mississippi AandM
Mississippi State Bulldogs football seasons
Mississippi AandM Aggies football